Nurse TV is an Australian community television project which has been in production since 2003. To date over 70 episodes about Australia's nursing profession have been produced.

External links 
 

2003 Australian television series debuts
Australian community access television shows
Australian medical television series
Nursing in Australia
Television shows set in Australia